The 2018 Chinese Football Association Division Two League season was the 29th season since its establishment in 1989. The league is expanded to 28 teams, with 14 teams in North Group and 14 teams in South Group.

On 11 July 2018, Anhui Hefei Guiguan and Shenyang Dongjin failed to register for the rest of the season due to salary arrears.

Team changes

To League Two 
Teams relegated from 2017 China League One 
 Baoding Yingli ETS
 Yunnan Lijiang 

Teams promoted from 2017 China Amateur Football League 
 Zibo Sunday
 Anhui Hefei Guiguan
 Yanbian Beiguo
 Fujian Tianxin 
 Shenzhen Pengcheng
 Sichuan Jiuniu

From League Two 
Teams promoted to 2018 China League One 
 Heilongjiang Lava Spring 
 Meixian Techand

Team withdrawal 
 <s>Chengdu Qbao<s>
 Shanghai JuJu Sports

Name changes 
 Yunnan Lijiang F.C. changed their name to Yunnan Flying Tigers in January 2018.

Clubs

Stadiums and Locations

Clubs Locations

Managerial changes

League tables

North Group

South Group

Overall table

Play-offs

25th–26th place

23rd–24th place

21st–22nd place

19th–20th place

17th–18th place

15th–16th place

13th–14th place

11th–12th place

9th–10th place

Quarter-finals

2–2 on aggregate. Shaanxi Chang'an Athletic won on away goals.

Nantong Zhiyun won 1–0 on aggregate.

Sichuan Longfor won 6–0 on aggregate.

Jiangsu Yancheng Dingli won 1–0 on aggregate.

Semi-finals

Nantong Zhiyun won 2–0 on aggregate.

Sichuan Longfor won 2–0 on aggregate.

Third-Place Match

Shaanxi Chang'an Athletic qualified to 2018 China League One relegation play-offs.

Final Match

Results

North Group

South Group

Results by match played

North Group

South Group

Top scorers
{| class="wikitable" style="text-align:center"
|-
! Rank
! Player
! Club
! Goals
|-
!rowspan=1|
|align="left" | Qu Cheng
|align="left" |Sichuan Longfor
|
|-
!rowspan=1|
|align="left" | Wang Feike
|align="left" |Hebei Elite
|
|-
!rowspan=1|
|align="left" | Yang He
|align="left" |Shaanxi Chang'an Athletic
|
|-
!rowspan=4|
|align="left" | Gong Zheng
|align="left" |Beijing BIT
|
|-
|align="left" | Hou Zhe
|align="left" |Baoding Yingli ETS
|
|-
|align="left" | Shi Jun
|align="left" |Hebei Elite
|
|-
|align="left" | Zhang Zhichao
|align="left" |Sichuan Longfor
|
|-
!rowspan=4|
|align="left" | Shang Yin
|align="left" |Sichuan Longfor
|
|-
|align="left" | Zhang Hao
|align="left" |Hunan Billows
|
|-
|align="left" | Zhuang Jiajie
|align="left" |Hunan Billows
|
|-

Awards
The awards of 2018 China League Two were announced on 19 December 2018.

League attendance

††

†
††
††
††
†

††

††

References

External links
Official site 
News and results at mytiyu.cn 

3
China League Two seasons